Predrag Joksimović  (born March 3, 1977) is a former Serbian professional basketball player who last played for Rabotnički.

References

External links
 BeoExcell :: PREDRAG JOKSIMOVIC IS THE FREE AGENT

1977 births
Living people
Basketball players from Belgrade
Basketball League of Serbia players
KK Mašinac players
KK Sloga players
KK Spartak Subotica players
OKK Beograd players
BKK Radnički players
Serbian expatriate basketball people in Greece
Serbian expatriate basketball people in Hungary
Serbian expatriate basketball people in Portugal
Serbian expatriate basketball people in North Macedonia
Serbian men's basketball players
Small forwards
Shooting guards